Lina Teoh Pick Lim (born 7 July 1976) is a Malaysian actress, TV Host, model and a former beauty pageant titleholder who was crowned as Miss Malaysia World 1998. She represented Malaysia in the Miss World 1998 pageant in Mahe Island, Seychelles where she placed as second runner up.

Personal life 
Born in Melbourne, Australia to a Malaysian Chinese father and a Dutch mother, Teoh spent most of her adult life in Malacca and Kuala Lumpur, Malaysia. In her late teens and 20s she has traveled extensively throughout South East Asia modeling in TV commercials and print/press ads for many high-profile brands, as well as on the runway. Teoh was trained in Show Biz Dance Academy in 1980-1992 where she studied 12 years of jazz ballet. She finished her study in  Australian Institute of Dramatic Arts in 1998.

Over the years she has hosted many television programs in Malaysia including Watch-U-Want for Channel V, a Malaysian tourism series, a sports series, a business series, a motivational talk show and a woman's talk show.

Pageantry

Miss World 1998 
Teoh became Miss Malaysia World and went on to represent Malaysia in the international Miss World 1998 competition in Seychelles. An amazing experience, Teoh spent a week in Paris and then 3 weeks on the beautiful Island of Mahe, where the finals were held. Competing against 93 other girls from all over the world. Teoh eventually placed as 2nd Runner-Up behind the grand winner Linor Abargil of Israel and 1st Runner-Up Véronique Caloc of France. She was declared as Miss World Asia and Oceania 1998. It is also the highest achievement ever by a Malaysian contestant at the Miss World pageant (as of 2021).

Acting stints 
Teoh had a leading role in the local English sitcom Kopitiam as Susan Lau, a snooty Singaporean lawyer. She also played a neurotic librarian in theatre production Forever Tyreen and a singer in the multi-media play Light Bulbs. The role gave her the honor of receiving a runner-up “Best Actress” award at the Asian Television Awards and a lifelong friendship with many of the cast and crew and with her castmate Douglas Lim, nominated as "Best Actor".

Teoh also produced documentary A Leader’s Legacy: Tun Abdul Razak on National Geographic Channel.

References

External links
 www.linateoh.com

1976 births
Living people
Australian emigrants to Malaysia
Australian people of Chinese descent
Australian people of Dutch descent
Australian people of Malaysian descent
Citizens of Malaysia through descent
Malaysian beauty pageant winners
Malaysian female models
Malaysian people of Chinese descent
Malaysian people of Dutch descent
Malaysian television actresses
Miss World 1998 delegates
People from Melbourne